Praz-sur-Arly (literally Praz on Arly) is a commune in the Haute-Savoie department in the Auvergne-Rhône-Alpes region in south-eastern France. It is part of the urban area of Sallanches.

The local people are called "Pralins" for men, and "Pralines" for women.

Geography 
The village of Praz-sur-Arly is 1,035 meters above sea level, in Val d'Arly, between Megève and Flumet. The river Arly goes through the village of Praz-sur-Arly as well as the Cassioz and Varins river streams.

See also
Communes of the Haute-Savoie department

References

Communes of Haute-Savoie
Ski resorts in France